The Navarro Chief is a British trimotor aircraft that was designed and built by Navarro Safety Aircraft.

Development
The Chief is a conventional landing gear-equipped, strut-braced, high wing aircraft. The wings are upturned. The elevators are hinged at angles in an attempt at developing a spin-resistant aircraft. The ailerons and elevators were interlinked for roll control. The rudder is split and could be deployed as a speed brake. The fuselage is wood with plywood covering.

Specifications (Chief)

See also

References

Trimotors